Ron Cooper (born 1943) is an American artist who grew up in Ojai, California and started his career in the late 1960s in Los Angeles. By 1973, Cooper had already participated in numerous international solo and group shows with pieces in the permanent collections of the Guggenheim Museum and LACMA, and special exhibitions such as that at the La Jolla Museum of Contemporary Art.

Career
Cooper began his work, art, and journey with Mezcal, a distilled alcoholic beverage, in 1970, when he visited the Mexican state Oaxaca.

Art
Cooper's art explores light, reflection, transparency, and color, through the medium of colored fluorescent lights, neon, and glass. In his Separator Variations series the colored fluorescent fixtures, separated by glass, reflect and appear to overlap combining the colors producing a third hue. Most of his pieces, like the Separator Variations series, demonstrate the additive nature of light. His other work includes environmental installations and neon focused on the same themes.

In 2009 Ron Cooper's work was included in a group exhibition at the Harwood Museum in Taos, New Mexico curated by Dennis Hopper called Hopper Curates - Larry Bell, Ron Cooper, Ronald Davis, Ken Price & Robert Dean Stockwell.

Mezcal
In Oaxaca, Cooper lived and worked with the locals, and strived to bring Mezcal to the world at large. He founded Del Maguey in the 1990s, bringing Mezcal to the awareness of American consumers as an artisanal or craft ingredient for many creative cocktails. Cooper has done dinner pairings with chefs José Andrés, and Mary Sue Milliken appeared on CNN with Anthony Bourdain, and in 2016 Cooper was awarded the James Beard Award for “Outstanding Wine, Beer, or Spirits Professional”.

Exhibitions 
Ron Cooper, An exhibition by the La Jolla Museum of Contemporary Art, La Jolla, California, May 13-July 1, 1973.

See also
Light sculpture

References

External links
Askart

1943 births
Living people
American contemporary artists
Artists from Taos, New Mexico
Artists from Los Angeles